Erol Küçükbakırcı (born 20 April 1952) is a Turkish former cyclist. He competed at the 1972 Summer Olympics and 1976 Summer Olympics. In 2016, he became President of the Turkish Cycling Federation.

References

External links
 

1952 births
Living people
Turkish male cyclists
Olympic cyclists of Turkey
Cyclists at the 1972 Summer Olympics
Cyclists at the 1976 Summer Olympics
Place of birth missing (living people)
Turkish sports executives and administrators
20th-century Turkish people